Dorud (also Romanized as Dorūd, Dūrūd, and Dow Rūd) is a city in and capital of Dorud County, Lorestan Province, Iran. At the 2016 census, its population was 121,638 persons.

Protests in 2017
At least 5 people were killed in Dorud on 30 December during 2017 Iranian protests. The New York Times reported 2 people killed in Dorud on 20 December during 2017 Iranian protests. In an interview on state television, the Deputy Governor of Lorestan Province blamed demonstration violence on “enemies of the revolution, Takfiri groups and foreign agents…No shots were fired by the police and security forces.”

Photo gallery

References

Towns and villages in Dorud County
Cities in Lorestan Province